This is a list of Acts of the Parliament of South Africa enacted in the years 2010 to 2019.

South African acts are uniquely identified by the year of passage and an act number within that year.

2010

2011

2012

2013

2014

2015

2016

2017

2018

2019

References
 Government Gazette of the Republic of South Africa, Volumes 537–.
 

2010